Bucculatrix xenaula is a moth of the family Bucculatricidae. It is found in South Australia. It was described in 1893 by Edward Meyrick.

Larvae have been found feeding on the leaves Sterculia and Brachychiton species.

External links
Australian Faunal Directory

Moths of Australia
Bucculatricidae
Moths described in 1893
Taxa named by Edward Meyrick